The Renault Type Y was an automobile produced between 1905 and 1906 by Renault.
It is believed that the mechanical structure and design came out as an evolution to that of the Renault Voiturette as is very similar to the Type C, D and E Voiturettes.

Type Y